Chubynske is a selo located in Boryspil Raion, Kyiv Oblast, Ukraine. It is the birthplace of Pavlo Chubynsky in whom the village is named for. Chubynske belongs to Prystolychna rural hromada, one of the hromadas of Ukraine.

Demographics
Native language as of the Ukrainian Census of 2001:
 Ukrainian 89.46%
 Russian 10.54%

References 

Villages in Boryspil Raion